Qatranilestes is an extinct genus of afrosoricid which existed in Fayum, Egypt during the earliest Oligocene period (Rupelian age). It was first named by Erik R. Seiffert in 2010 and the type species is Qatranilestes oligocaenus. As of 2010, Qatranilestes was the youngest known afrosoricid fossil from Egypt.

References

Prehistoric placental genera
Fossil taxa described in 2010
Oligocene mammals of Africa